Web of Fate is a 1927 American silent drama film directed by Dallas M. Fitzgerald and starring Lillian Rich, Henry Sedley and Eugene Strong.

Cast
 Lillian Rich as Gloria Gunther / Beverly Townsend 
 Henry Sedley as Linton 
 Eugene Strong as Don Eddington 
 John Cossar as Carlton Townsend 
 Frances Raymond as Mrs. Townsend

References

Bibliography
 Larry Langman & Daniel Finn. A guide to American silent crime films. Greenwood Press, 1994.

External links
 

1927 films
1927 drama films
1920s English-language films
American silent feature films
Silent American drama films
Films directed by Dallas M. Fitzgerald
American black-and-white films
1920s American films